Priye Ninakku Vendi is a 1975 Indian Malayalam film,  directed by Mallikarjuna Rao and produced by V. Prabhakara Rao. The film stars Jayabharathi, Sukumaran, Sudheer and Vincent in the lead roles. The film has musical score by R. K. Shekhar.

Cast

Jayabharathi
Sukumaran
Sudheer
Vincent
KPAC Lalitha
Jose Prakash
Prema
Kuthiravattam Pappu

Soundtrack
The music was composed by R. K. Shekhar and the lyrics were written by Vayalar and Bharanikkavu Sivakumar.

References

External links
 

1975 films
1970s Malayalam-language films